The United Nations Interagency Task Force on the Prevention and Control of Non-communicable Diseases (UNIATF), hereafter referred to as the Task Force, was established by the United Nations Secretary-General in 2013. Non-communicable diseases (NCDs), also known as chronic diseases, include cardiovascular diseases, cancers, chronic respiratory diseases and diabetes. The role of the Task Force is to bring relevant actors from across the United Nations (UN) system and national governments together to develop whole-of-government, whole-of-society approaches for the prevention and control of NCDs. Following the establishment of the 2030 Agenda for Sustainable Development in 2015, the Task Force's scope of work was expanded to include “NCD related Sustainable Development Goals (SDGs)” such as addressing mental health conditions, violence, injuries, nutrition and environmental issues that contribute to the global burden of NCDs. The Task Force promotes multisectoral action for the prevention and control of NCDs, supports countries to achieve the Sustainable Development Goals (SDGs) and supports countries to move towards Universal Health Coverage (UHC). The work of the Task Force includes implementing the Global Joint Programme to conduct investment cases, coordinating interagency joint programmes and facilitating thematic working groups. The World Health Organization acts as a Secretariat for the Task Force.

At the end of 2018, there were 41 members of the Task Force, some of which are from within the UN System. These agencies included: AfDB, ERBD, FAO, GFATM, IAEA, ICRC, IDB, IDLO, ILO, INCB, IOM, IOC, ITU, OECD, OHCHR, OIC, OSDP, UNAIDS, UNCTAD, UNDP, UNECA, UNESCO, UNEP, UNESCAP, UNFPA, UNHABITAT, UNHCR, UNICEF, UNODC, UNOPS, UNOSSC, UNRWA, UNSCN, UNU, UNWomen, WHO, WHOFCTC, WIPO, WFP, WorldBank, and WTO.

Establishment
The Task Force was established in 2013 by the UN Secretary General in an Economic and Social Council (ECOSOC) Resolution in response to the 2011 Political Declaration of the High-level Meeting of the General Assembly on the Prevention and Control of NCDs. Overseen by the World Health Organization, the Task Force's mandate is to support the Global Action Plan for the Prevention and Control of Non-communicable Diseases 2013–2020, as well as the NCD-related targets within Sustainable Development Goals. The WHO Director-General provides a report on the work of the Task Force through the UN Secretary General once a year to ECOSOC.

Objectives

The overall objective of the Task Force is to support the implementation of the Global Action Plan for the Prevention and Control of Non-communicable Diseases 2013–2020 and the Sustainable Development Goals. The Task Force Strategy, 2019-2021 has four priorities in line with the Task Force's Terms of Reference and mandates provided through United Nations General Assembly Political Declarations and ECOSOC resolutions. The strategic priorities include the following:

 Supporting countries to deliver multisectoral action on the NCD-related SDG targets
 Mobilizing resources to support the development of national responses to reach the NCD-related SDG targets
 Supporting countries by harmonising its work with other global health and development initiatives and forging multi-stakeholder partnerships and alliances at all levels to achieve NCD-related SDG targets
 Being an exemplar for UN reform.

Action

Global joint programme 
The Global Join Programme is coordinated by the Task Force and the main focus of the programme is to develop national NCD investment cases to assist countries in quantifying the costs of NCDs and the benefits of scaled up action for prevention and control, both in the health sector and the economy at large. The burden of NCDs is of great magnitude and has both socioeconomic and developmental impacts and national NCD investment cases are aimed at empowering governments, especially ministries of health, to make a compelling, evidence-informed cases to advocate for NCD investments.

Experiences from previously developed NCD investment cases have demonstrated that these reports help ministries of health better understand funding priorities, to reconsider budget allocations towards the prevention and control of NCDs, and to appeal to ministries of finance for increased investment in the area of NCDs as well as to justify the need for development of multisectoral engagement.

The investment case framework quantifies the costs and benefits of NCD treatment and prevention in national currencies. This allows for demonstration of return-on-investments (ROIs) for various NCD prevention and control interventions e.g. if a government invests x million in NCD prevention, y million will be returned to the national economy over a z time period. This enables actors, such as ministries of health and ministries of finance, to easily compare different investment choices and the returns that they generate not only within the health sector but beyond.

Twenty national NCD investment cases conducted to date and have highlighted the approach set out in the Addis Ababa Action Agenda, which recommended development assistance to be catalytic, allowing countries to raise resources locally for the implementation of the national SDG plans. Examples of these investment cases can be found on the Task Force website.

Joint programmes

UNDP/WHO Joint Programme to catalyse multisectoral action on NCDs 
The WHO-UNDP Global Joint Programme on NCDs supports countries to develop coordinated national responses on their NCD epidemics by strengthening efforts across sectors. The Joint Programme creates strong multisectoral partnerships at the national and subnational level by calling together different sectors around five priority areas for NCD response: national NCD investment cases; standardized mechanisms for stakeholders to collaborate on NCD prevention and control; municipal initiatives to address community-specific NCD challenges; cross-cutting approaches to deliver successes for NCDs; and multisectoral action to reduce key NCD risk factors and prevent diseases onset. These are developed in line with United Nations development group guidance and provide a mechanism for raising funds for the work of the Task Force at country level.

SAFER 
SAFER is a new initiative and technical package released by WHO. The package outlines 5 high-impact strategies that can help governments to reduce the harmful use of alcohol and related health, social and economic consequences. SAFER is the newest WHO-led roadmap to support governments in taking practical steps to accelerate progress on health, beat NCDs through addressing the harmful use of alcohol, and achieve development targets.

Global Regulatory & Fiscal Capacity Building Programme: Promoting Healthy Diets and Physical Activity 
In 2014 International Development Law Organisation (IDLO) signed agreements with WHO and the Caribbean Public Health Agency (CARPHA) to build legal capacity to address public health challenges. The initial focus is on obesity, diabetes, healthy diets and physical activity. Also in 2014, IDLO, the WHO and the University of Sydney convened the first regional consultation on overweight, obesity, diabetes and law in the Western Pacific. IDLO will support further regional consultations and national capacity building of government, academic and civil society partners to strengthen national legal frameworks and capacity to address NCDs. Programs will be tailored to regional and national needs.

UN Joint Global Programme on Cervical Cancer Prevention and Control 
To build on what exists and enhance progress, several UN agencies working under the Task Force established a five-year Joint Programme to prevent and control cervical cancer. The Joint Programme provides leadership and technical assistance in supporting governments and their partners build and sustain high-quality national comprehensive cervical cancer control programmes, ensuring women have equitable access to services. In addition, the Joint Programme working alongside global and national partners utilize new technologies to scale up action, reduce the costs of vaccines and apply innovative approaches to ensure women have access to functioning and sustainable high-quality services.

FCTC2030: Strengthening WHO FCTC implementation to achieve the SDGs 
Tobacco is a major public health concern and a barrier to development around the world. The FCTC 2030 project is strengthening tobacco control in low- and middle-income countries through promoting and supporting governments to accelerate the implementation of the WHO FCTC.

ITU-WHO Mobile Health for NCDs Initiative 
The International Telecommunication Union and the World Health Organization are developing programs that use mobile technologies to improve the prevention and control of NCDs. The two organizations collaborate with a range of Member States and other partners in a pioneering initiative which focuses on the use of mobile technologies to improve the prevention and treatment of NCDs. This partnership aims to contribute to global and national efforts to save lives, minimize illness and disability, and reduce the social and economic burden that NCDs create.

UNODC-WHO-UICC Joint Global Programme on Access to Controlled Drugs for Medical Purposes While Preventing Diversion and Abuse 
The Joint Global Programme is a partnership between the United Nations Office on Drugs and Crime (UNDOC), World Health Organization (WHO) and the Union for International Cancer Control (UICC). The objective is to lead a coordinated worldwide response to improve access to controlled drugs for medical purposes, while controlling for abuse and diversion, therefore increasing the number of patients globally receiving appropriate treatment

UNODC-WHO Joint Programme for Drug Dependence Treatment and Care 
The Joint Programme on Drug Dependence Treatment and Care is a collaboration between UNODC and WHO. The aim is to support the development of comprehensive, integrated health-based approaches to drug policies that can reduce demand for illicit substances, relieve suffering and decrease drug-related harm to individuals, families, communities and societies.

Thematic working groups 
Thematic working groups  allow Task Force members to align existing resources more effectively at both the global and country levels. The established thematic working groups focus closely on specific issues relating to NCDs such as tobacco, nutrition and alcohol and aim to encourage increased coordination between agencies in order to support the SDG 2030 Agenda. The five groups providing platforms for collaboration between different UN agencies include:

 Mental Health
 NCDs and the Environment
 Nutrition and NCDs
 Physical Activity
 Tobacco Control

Impacts
In 2016, the UN Economic and Social Council (ECOSOC) reviewed a report on the work of the UN Inter-Agency Task Force on NCDs and adopted a resolution broadening the scope of the work of the Task Force to include NCD-related targets in the 2030 Agenda for Sustainable Development. The work of the Task Force contributed to the development of the following policies regarding NCD prevention and control:

 Barbados adopted a sugar-sweetened beverage tax in 2015.
 Barbados, Belarus and Turkey enhanced their tobacco control legislation. 
 Belarus established an Intersectoral Coordination Council on NCDs, to oversee implementation of the State program for NCD control and is chaired by the Deputy Prime Minister.
 India has had great success with the mHealth global joint programme, with over 2 million users enrolled and results showing over 7% of the program users did not use tobacco for at least 6 months in 2017.
 Kyrgyzstan included NCD-related targets into their national SDG adaptation agenda.
 Mozambique received encouragement and political momentum to ratify the WHO FCTC in 2016.
 Mongolia increased excise taxes on tobacco and alcohol.
 Oman began working on the removal of subsidies for unhealthy foods and the implementation of a 50% tax on sugar-sweetened drinks and a 100% tax on energy drinks. Trans fats regulations were also adopted by the government.
 Sri Lanka introduced a traffic light labelling system in 2016 for high sugar products. They also implemented a maximum price policy in order to reduce the out of pocket cost on 48 essential medicines, including all essential medicines for NCDs.
 Zambia formed a government-wide multi-sectoral committee in 2017, charged with the implementation of the WHO-FCTC in order to mainstream tobacco control policies across government.
 Barbados launched a National Childhood Obesity Strategy in 2018.
 Belarus introduced smoke-free legislation, including e-cigarettes, in January 2019.
 Belarus increased excise tax for tobacco products and alcohol in 2019.

Selected documents

United Nations Inter-Agency Task Force on the Prevention and Control of Non-communicable Diseases 2019-2021 Strategy 
Countries face many challenges in responding to the rapid rise in NCDs and the need to improve mental health as part of the 2030 Agenda for Sustainable Development. These challenges include:

 Insufficient political action on NCDs
 Limited government capacity for policy development, coherence and implementation
 Insufficient domestic and international finance 
 Issues around the impact of economic, market and commercial factors 
 Weak health systems, including limited progress on achieving Universal Health Coverage

Task Force Brochure 
The Task Force Brochure outlines the agenda and objectives of the Task Force.

Policy Briefs for Government Departments 
This set of briefs has been produced to provide policy makers across governmental ministries information on the multisectoral impact of NCDs and ways in which these impacts can be mitigated through action in their relevant sector. These briefs are aimed to enable ministries to:

 Implement the 2030 Agenda for Sustainable Development, including strengthened implementation of the World Health Organization Framework Convention on Tobacco Control
 Recognize that NCDs present a major challenge to their sector and the national development agenda
 Identify concrete steps that can be taken in their sector to tackle NCDs; • Implement commitments agreed in the 2011 UN Political Declaration and 2014 UN Outcome Document on NCDs
 Enact the WHO Global NCD Action Plan 2013-2020, in particular the set of very cost-effective and affordable interventions for all countries, and policy options to promote a whole-of-government and whole-of-society response to reducing risk factors and enabling health systems to respond

References

External links
  UNIATF website
 How NCDs are reflected in governing body policies, strategies and plans
 Guidance note on the integration of noncommunicable diseases into the United Nations development assistance framework

Organizations established by the United Nations
Organizations established in 2013